The Historical P-40C Tomahawk is an American homebuilt aircraft that was designed and produced by the Historical Aircraft Corporation of Nucla, Colorado. The aircraft is a 62.5% scale replica of the original Curtiss P-40C Tomahawk and when it was available was supplied as a kit for amateur construction.

Design and development
The aircraft features a cantilever low-wing, a single-seat enclosed cockpit under a framed aircraft canopy, retractable conventional landing gear and a single engine in tractor configuration.

The aircraft is made from welded steel tubing covered in a shell of polyurethane foam and fiberglass. The standard engine used is the  Ford Motor Company V-6 automotive conversion powerplant.

The kit included prefabricated assemblies, the engine and scale fixed pitch propeller, instruments, avionics and even paint. The manufacturer estimated the construction time from the supplied kit as 2000 hours.

Specifications (P-40C)

References

P-40C Tomahawk
1990s United States sport aircraft
Single-engined tractor aircraft
Low-wing aircraft
Homebuilt aircraft
Replica aircraft